Brian Mulvihill (born 1986) is an Irish Gaelic footballer who plays as a right corner-forward for the Tipperary senior team.

Born in Clonmel, County Tipperary, Mulvihill first arrived on the inter-county scene at the age of sixteen when he first linked up with the Tipperary minor team before later joining the under-21 side. He joined the senior panel during the 2005 championship. Mulvihill immediately became a regular member of the starting fifteen and has won one Tommy Murphy Cup medal and 3 NFL titles (2x Division 4 and 1x Division 3).

At club level Mulvihill is a two-time championship medallist with Moyle Rovers. Mulvihill won a North American Championship medal with Wolfe Tones, Chicago in 2006.

Honours

Player

Moyle Rovers
Tipperary Senior Football Championship (2): 2007, 2009

Tipperary
Tommy Murphy Cup (1): 2005

References

1986 births
Living people
Moyle Rovers Gaelic footballers
Tipperary inter-county Gaelic footballers